Scopula sauteri is a moth of the family Geometridae. It is found in Taiwan.

References

Moths described in 1922
sauteri
Moths of Taiwan